George Justinian (born January 24, 1954) is a former Romanian ice hockey player. He played for the Romania men's national ice hockey team at the 1976 Winter Olympics in Innsbruck, and the 1980 Winter Olympics in Lake Placid.

References

1954 births
Living people
Ice hockey players at the 1976 Winter Olympics
Ice hockey players at the 1980 Winter Olympics
Olympic ice hockey players of Romania
Romanian ice hockey defencemen
Sportspeople from Bucharest
Steaua Rangers players